Giaa Manek is an Indian television actress. Before venturing into the television industry, she played a minor role in the 2010 Hindi comedy film Na Ghar Ke Na Ghaat Ke. Popular television shows to her credit are Star Plus's Saath Nibhaana Saathiya, SAB TV's Jeannie Aur Juju and Star Bharat's Tera Mera Saath Rahe. In 2012, she had participated in the dance reality show Jhalak Dikhhla Jaa 5. In 2014, she was also a part of Box Cricket League Season 1.

Early life 
Manek was born on 18 February 1986 in Ahmedabad, Gujarat, India. She is of Gujarati descent.

Career 
Manek started her career in 2010, when she joined the cast of Saath Nibhaana Saathiya as Gopi. In 2012, she participated in a reality show Jhalak Dikhhla Jaa 5 and post the show was cast on Jeannie Aur Juju as Jeannie. In 2019, she was temporarily cast on Zee TV's Mahmohini as Gopika. From 2021 to 2022, she is playing the role of Gopika Modi in the show Tera Mera Saath Rahe, the reboot series of Saath Nibhaana Saathiya.

Filmography

Films

Television

Accolades

References

External links

 

Living people
Place of birth missing (living people)
Indian television actresses
Gujarati people
1986 births